Mie combor is a noodle soup from Kraksaan district in Probolinggo. The word combor is Javanese, which means in abundant gravy. Noodles, bean sprouts, free-range chicken, and a salted duck egg are all ingredients in the noodle soup.

Other version 
There is another version of mie combor in Kediri specifically in the Gampengrejo district. The ingredients are flat noodles like tagliatelle pasta, shredded chicken, meatball, hot sauce, sambal, sweet soy sauce, and doused with broth.

See also 

 List of noodle dishes
 Noodle soup

References 

Indonesian noodle dishes
Noodle soups